Endropiodes is a genus of moths in the family Geometridae.

Species
 Endropiodes abjecta (Butler, 1879)
 Endropiodes indictinaria (Bremer, 1864)

References
 Endropiodes at Markku Savela's Lepidoptera and Some Other Life Forms
 Natural History Museum Lepidoptera genus database

Ourapterygini
Geometridae genera